The Kota–Hisar Express is an Express train belonging to West Central Railway zone that runs between  and  in India.

Background
This train was running as Kota–Jaipur passenger with number 59801/02 till 20 November 2017 and after it was converted into an express train with numbered 19807/08 for reducing the time of distance between both of cities. But for direct connectivity Hisar it was Extended to Hisar Junction on 17 January 2020 with four days by passing through  of 3 days and rest of 4 days passes through .

Service
The Kota–Hisar Express has an average speed of 48 km/hr and covers 592 km in 12h 23m.

Routing
This train passes through Kota Junction,
 to reach Hisar Junction.

Coach composition
The train has standard ICF rakes with max speed of 110 kmph. The train consists of 13 coaches:

 1 AC II Tier
 1 AC III Tier
 5 Sleeper coaches
 4 General Unreserved
 2 Seating cum Luggage Rake

Traction
Both trains are hauled by a Ratlam Loco Shed-based WDM-3A diesel locomotive on both sides.

See also 

 Kota Junction railway station
 Jaipur Junction railway station
 Hisar Junction railway station

References

External links 
 19807/Kota–Hisar Express India Rail Info
 19808/Hisar–Kota Express India Rail Info

Transport in Kota, Rajasthan
Transport in Jaipur
Rail transport in Rajasthan
Express trains in India
Railway services introduced in 2017